Patrick Raphael has been the Governor of Gbudwe State, South Sudan since 24 December 2015. He is the first governor of the state, which was created by President Salva Kiir on 2 October 2015.

References

Living people
South Sudanese politicians
Year of birth missing (living people)